Hong Kong A1 Division Championship, abbreviated as HKA1 and A1 Division, is the top division of men's basketball league in Hong Kong.

Current clubs 
A total of ten teams contested in the 2021 season:

 Eagles (飛鷹)
 Eastern (東方)
 Fukien (福建)
 HKPA Basketball Team (遊協)
 Nam Ching (南青)
 South China (南華)
 Winling (永倫)
 Tycoon Basketball Team (滿貫)
 Able Hon Friends (安保漢友）
 Pegasus basketball club(建龍飛馬)

References

External links 
 Hong Kong Basketball Association official website

Basketball competitions in Hong Kong